Nimoa may be,

Nimoa Island
Nimoa language